Toei Superheroes are superhero shows produced by Toei Company, a company that has done the largest number of live-action tokusatsu superhero shows in Japan. Many of the Toei Superheroes were featured in the video special Toei 100 Great Hero Super Fight (東映100大ヒーロー スーパーファイト) released on July 21, 1986.

Some of the series are said to be created by Saburo Yatsude (八手三郎), not an actual person, but a collective pseudonym for the staff of Toei (similar to Hajime Yatate, a name used by the staff of the Sunrise division of Japanese animation company Bandai Namco Filmworks). Others were created by Shotaro Ishinomori, which includes Kamen Rider,  Gorenger and J.A.K.Q. Dengekitai for the Super Sentai series, Android Kikaider, and Inazuman, among others.

This is the complete list of Toei films and TV shows that were released and televised. It is organized by year of release date and in chronological order.

1950s

1960s

1970s

1980s

1990s

2000s

2010s

2020s

Notes

References

Tokusatsu television series
Toei tokusatsu